BRCA1-associated ATM activator 1 is a protein in humans that is encoded by the BRAT1 gene.

Function 

The protein encoded by this ubiquitously expressed gene interacts with the tumor suppressing BRCA1 (breast cancer 1) protein and the ATM (ataxia telangiectasia mutated) protein. ATM is thought to be a master controller of cell cycle checkpoint signalling pathways that are required for cellular responses to DNA damage such as double-strand breaks that are induced by ionizing radiation and complexes with BRCA1 in the multi-protein complex BASC (BRAC1-associated genome surveillance complex). The protein encoded by this gene is thought to play a role in the DNA damage pathway regulated by BRCA1 and ATM.

References

External links
 
 PDBe-KB provides an overview of all the structure information available in the PDB for Human BRCA1-associated ATM activator

Genes
Human proteins